SM U-64 was a Type U-63 class submarine in the Kaiserliche Marine that served during World War I. She was built in 1916 and served in the Mediterranean Sea.

U-64 torpedoed Danton which sank in 45 minutes with the loss of 296 men.

During her career, U-64 was under the command of Kapitänleutnant Robert Moraht. She was lost on 17 June 1918.

Summary of raiding history

References

Notes

Citations

Bibliography

External links 
 Wreck Site U-64.

Type U 63 submarines
World War I submarines of Germany
1916 ships
Ships built in Kiel
U-boats commissioned in 1916
Maritime incidents in 1918
U-boats sunk in 1918
U-boats sunk by British warships
World War I shipwrecks in the Mediterranean Sea